OJSC Bashkirenergo (Russian: ОАО «Башкирэнерго») was a power and heat company operating in Bashkortostan, Russia. The major shareholder of the company is a holding company Sistema. 21.27% of shares is owned by the Russian grid company FGC UES.

The company was dissolved in 2012, and the assets were divided between Bashenergoaktiv and Bashkir Grid Company; Bashenergoaktiv became part of Inter RAO.

References

External links

 

Companies based in Ufa
Sistema
Defunct electric power companies of Russia